Joana Biarnés (Terrassa, 1935–2018) was a Spanish photographer and photojournalist of Catalan descent. She is considered Spanish' first woman photojournalist.

Biarnés'  work was presented in exhibitions and festivals.  Her work was chronicled in the book Disparant amb el cor (Shooting from the Heart).

Exhibitions 
 "Viatge a un arxiu. Crònica fotogràfica de la descoberta de Joana Biarnés 2015–2019" (A Voyage into an Archive: Photographic Chronicles of the Discovery of Joana Biarnés 2015–2019) Palau Robert, Barcelona.

References 

Photographers from Catalonia
People from Terrassa
1935 births
2018 deaths